Lars Horntveth (born 10 March 1980 in Tønsberg, Norway) is a Norwegian musician (saxophones, clarinet, percussion and guitar), band leader, and composer. He is the younger brother of tubaist Line Horntveth, but best known as a key member of the bands Jaga Jazzist and The National Bank, together with his brother Martin Horntveth.

Career 
In summer 2003 the brothers wrote a commissioned work to the "Vestfold Festival" in Tønsberg. The work was performed by the musicians who later became the band The National Bank. With his brother and the Lyricist Martin Hagfors, he received the Edvard Prize in 2005 in the Class for pop music for the tune "Tolerate" from the band's debut album The National Bank. In 2004 he released a solo album Pooka on Smalltown Supersound. For this he received Spellemannprisen 2004 in the class electronica and contemporary music and Alarmprisen 2005 in the class jazz. In 2008 he released his second solo album by the name Kaleidoscopic. The album consists of a 38 minutes long work, and is recorded with the Latvia National Symphony Orchestra. The album was released during the Øyafestivalen, with KORK as orchestra.

He is also a widely used wind and string arranger for various artists like Turboneger, Ingrid Olava and Marit Larsen, and as a backer for artists like Susanne Sundfør. In 2009 he played on the renowned Sonar Festival in Barcelona. and in addition he has contributed to about 50 releases.

Honors 
Spellemannprisen 2004 in the class electronica and contemporary music, for the solo album Pooka
"Alarmprisen" 2005 in the class jazz
Edvard Prize 2005 in the class Pop music with The National Bank for "Tolerate" from the band's debut album The National Bank

Discography

Solo works 
2004: Pooka (Smalltown Supersound)
2008: Kaleidoscopic (Smalltown Supersound)

Cooperative works 
Within Jaga Jazzist
1996: Jævla Jazzist Grete Stitz (Thug Records)
1998: Magazine EP
2001: A Livingroom Hush (Warner Music Norway)
2001: Airborne/Going Down EP (Warner Music Norway)
2001: Going Down 12" (Smalltown Supersound)
2002: The Stix (Smalltown Supersound / Warner Music Norway)
2002: Days 12", (Smalltown Supersound)
2003: Animal Chin EP 12" (Golden Standard Labs)
2005: What We Must (Ninja Tune / Smalltown Supersound / Sonet)
2010: One-Armed Bandit (Sonet)
2015: Starfire (Ninja Tune)

Within The National Bank
2004: The National Bank (Universal Music, Norway)
2008: Come on Over to the Other Side (Universal)

With other projects
2001: Great Curves (Jester Records), within "Rotoscope»
2002: In The Fishtank (Konkurrent), with Motorpsycho & "Jaga Jazzist Horns»

References

External links 
 Lars Horntveth on Myspace

Jaga Jazzist members
20th-century Norwegian multi-instrumentalists
21st-century Norwegian multi-instrumentalists
20th-century Norwegian guitarists
21st-century Norwegian guitarists
20th-century Norwegian saxophonists
21st-century Norwegian saxophonists
Norwegian guitarists
Norwegian male guitarists
Norwegian saxophonists
Norwegian composers
Norwegian male composers
1980 births
Living people
The National Bank (band) members
Smalltown Supersound artists
Musicians from Tønsberg